Ethmia nadia is a moth in the family Depressariidae. It is found in California.

The ground color of the forewings is dark
gray, but paler distally. There are dark spots adjoining a longitudinal streak. Adults are on wing from March to May (in southern California) and from June to July (in Siskiyou County).

The larvae feed on Phacelia ramosissima.

References

nadia
Endemic fauna of California
Moths of North America
Fauna of the California chaparral and woodlands
Moths described in 1950
Fauna without expected TNC conservation status